The TRNA INDIA Pune Football League is organised by Pune District Football Association, and is a ladder-based competition involving a total of four divisions and 100+ teams. The PFL features teams from all over the city from Pimpri-Chinchwad all the way up to Hadapsar.  

Teams at the top level i.e. – PFL Super and First Divisions have a professional/semi-professional setup and usually practice three times a week on average and the players are on a previously agreed monthly stipend. Instead of a monthly stipend, players in the lower divisions are given match fees per game, which usually range between 50-300 rupees per game depending on the result - apart from conveyance allowances (Certain low-budget teams do not provide any monetary benefit.) These teams usually conduct practices once a week on average.

Apart from a coach and team manager, most teams do not have any support staff like physiotherapists or nutritionists. While the manager handles all the financial matters of the club, everything else is handled by the team coach.

Trials are conducted by all clubs in the pre-season phase after which the final team of twenty-two players is registered with the Mumbai District Football Association. No player can play for two teams in the same calendar year.

While the initial round-robin phase generally lasts for a period of three months, the top teams continue their campaign in another month-long post-season phase to determine the champions and the promoted teams.

League structure

Super Division 
The Super Division is the top most division in PFL organized by Pune District Football Association.

Super Division Format 
 
All the teams will play each other in an all-play-all format The top 6 teams from each group will advance to the post-season playoffs. The points and goals scored in the preliminary phase will not be carried forward to the next round.
The team standing first and second after the completion of the round-robin playoff league shall be declared the winner and runner-up and will be promoted to the MAHA League (Season 2018-19). The bottom 2 Teams after the completion of the preliminary league will be demoted to the Division One (Season 2019-20).

Participating Teams

Division One 
The brand new Division One structure decided by the Pune District Football Association (PDFA)

Division One Format  
 
 All the teams in the division will be divided into two or more groups and shall play a preliminary phase of round-robin games.
 The top two teams from each group will advance to the post-season playoffs.
 The points and goals scored in the preliminary phase will not be carried forward to the next round.
 The team standing first and second after the completion of the round-robin playoff league shall be declared the winner and runner-up and will be promoted to the Super Division (Season 2018-19).
 The teams in last place in each group after the completion of the preliminary league will be demoted to the Division Two (Season 2019-20).

Participating Teams

Division Two 

The Pune District Football Association (PDFA) announced the Division Two, to be contested by Twenty Teams like last year.

Division Two Format
 
 All the teams in the division will be divided into three groups and shall play a preliminary phase of round-robin games.
 The top two teams from each group will advance to the post-season playoffs.
 The points and goals scored in the preliminary phase will not be carried forward to the next round.
 The post season playoffs will include a league phase followed by a single-leg knock out format to decide who will contest the Division Two Final.
 All eight quarter-finalists will be promoted to the Division One (Season 2019-20).

Participating Teams

Division Three 
The decision to revamp the structure of the Pune Football League by the Pune District Football Association (PDFA) brings one of the biggest divisions –  to form the new PFL Division Three. This Year -51 Teams will participate in This Third Division
 
Division Three Format
 All the teams in the division will be divided into eight or more groups and shall play a preliminary phase of round-robin games.
 The top two/three teams from each group will advance to the post-season playoffs.
 The points and goals scored in the preliminary phase will not be carried forward to the next round .
 The post season playoffs will include a league phase followed by a single-leg knock out format to decide who will contest the Division Three Final .
 All eight quarter-finalists will be promoted to the Division Two (Season 2019-20).

Participating Teams

References

External links 
 Official Website

5
League